Amber Wings is a 2003 Russian romantic drama film directed by Andrey Razenkov.

Plot 
The film tells about the relationship of a lawyer from Germany and a Russian actress who meet on Christmas evening in a small store in Tallinn.

Cast 
 Alyona Bondarchuk as Daughter
 Aleksandr Baluev as Lawyer Aleksandr
 Irina Skobtseva as Yelizaveta Sergeyevna
 Lembit Ulfsak as Robert
 Arnis Licitis
 Ita Ever as Marta
 Valdo Reitel
 Merle Palmiste as Juta
 Tim-Taniel Puting	
 Elle Kull

References

External links 
 

2003 films
2000s Russian-language films
Russian romantic drama films
2003 romantic drama films